"Amanda" is an uptempo song written by  Thomas G:son and Jimmy Jansson, and performed by Jimmy Jansson at Melodifestivalen 2007. The song participated in the competition inside Scandinavium on 10 February 2007, and went further to Andra chansen, but failed to reach the final inside the Stockholm Globe Arena. The song was originally written for Melodifestivalen 2004, but was rejected, which happened again when applying for Melodifestivalen 2005 and 2006.

Single 
Released as a single on 5 March 2007, it peaked at third position at the Swedish singles chart. A 22 April 2007 attempt to also enter Svensktoppen, however, failed.

Track listing 
Amanda
Vild & vacker
Amanda (singback)

Charts

Other recording 
Spanish group D'NASH recorded the song with lyrics in Spanish, and released it as a single in 2007.

References

External links
Information at Svensk mediedatabas

2007 singles
English-language Swedish songs
Melodifestivalen songs of 2007
Songs written by Thomas G:son
Songs written by Jimmy Jansson
2007 songs